My Brother Joshua is a 1956 West German drama film directed by Hans Deppe and starring Willy A. Kleinau, Ingrid Andree and Kenneth Spencer. It is a heimatfilm.

It was made at the Wandsbek Studios in Hamburg. The film's sets were designed by the art director Willi Herrmann and Heinrich Weidemann. It was shot in Eastmancolor.

Cast
 Willy A. Kleinau as Mathias Bruckner
 Ingrid Andree as Lena, Bruckners Tochter
 Kenneth Spencer as Josua Washington Stone
 Gunnar Möller as Christoph Wiesner
 Jan Hendriks as Hans Donath, beider Sohn
 Berta Drews as Franziska Donath
 Karl Hellmer as Joseph Donath, Franziskas Mann
 Hans Nielsen as Der Pfarrer
 Gudrun Schmidt as Hildegard, die Kellnerin
 Franz Schafheitlin as Der Bürgermeister
 Gottfried Geissler as Vinzent Heindl, Wirt
 Manfred Meurer as Der amerikanische Captain
 Otto Schwartz as Der Großknecht

References

Bibliography 
 Gerhard Bliersbach. So grün war die Heide: der deutsche Nachkriegsfilm in neuer Sicht. Beltz, 1985.

External links 
 

1956 films
1956 drama films
German drama films
West German films
1950s German-language films
Films directed by Hans Deppe
Films shot at Wandsbek Studios
1950s German films